Hugh Shaw (29 April 1929 – 8 May 1985) was a footballer who played as a full back in the Football League for Tranmere Rovers.

References

1929 births
1985 deaths
Sportspeople from Clydebank
Footballers from West Dunbartonshire
Association football wing halves
Scottish footballers
Duntocher Hibernian F.C. players
Dumbarton F.C. players
Rhyl F.C. players
Tranmere Rovers F.C. players
Stranraer F.C. players
Scottish Junior Football Association players
Scottish Football League players
English Football League players